Megachile jamaicae is a species of bee in the family Megachilidae. It was described by Raw in 1984.

References

Jamaicae
Insects described in 1984